Tambovsky District  is an administrative and municipal district (raion), one of the twenty-three in Tambov Oblast, Russia. It is located in the center of the oblast. The district borders with Sosnovsky District in the north, Rasskazovsky District in the east, Znamensky District in the south, and with Nikiforovsky District in the west. Its administrative center is the city of Tambov (which is not administratively a part of the district). Population: 102,786 (2010 Census);

Administrative and municipal status
Within the framework of administrative divisions, Tambovsky District is one of the twenty-three in the oblast. The city of Tambov serves as its administrative center, despite being incorporated separately as a city of oblast significance—an administrative unit with the status equal to that of the districts.

As a municipal division, the district is incorporated as Tambovsky Municipal District. The city of oblast significance of Tambov is incorporated separately from the district as Tambov Urban Okrug.

References

Sources

Districts of Tambov Oblast
